Baumbach Lake is a lake in Douglas County, in the U.S. state of Minnesota.

Baumbach Lake was named for Frederick von Baumbach, an early settler and afterward Minnesota Secretary of State.

See also
List of lakes in Minnesota

References

Lakes of Minnesota
Lakes of Douglas County, Minnesota